George Daniels (19 September 1807 – 2 October 1853) was an English cricketer.  Daniels' batting style is unknown.  He was born at Midhurst, Sussex.

Daniels made his first-class debut for Sussex against Surrey in 1830. He made three further first-class appearances for Sussex, against Surrey in a return match in 1830 and Nottinghamshire and Yorkshire in 1835.  He later played in Sussex County Cricket Club's inaugural first-class match against the Marylebone Cricket Club at Lord's in 1839.  In his total of five first-class matches, Daniels scored a total of 46 runs at an average of 5.11, with a high score of 13.

He died at the town of his birth on 2 October 1853.

References

External links
George Daniels at ESPNcricinfo
George Daniels at CricketArchive

1807 births
1853 deaths
People from Midhurst
English cricketers
Sussex cricketers